Accelerator Test Facility may refer to:

 Accelerator Test Facility (Japan) (KEK-ATF)
 Accelerator Test Facility (New York) (BNL-ATF), US